The CEV Champions League was the highest level of European club volleyball in the 2013–14 season and the 55th edition. It ran from 22 October 2013 until 16 March 2014.

Dinamo Kazan from Russia won the tournament and qualified for the 2014 FIVB Club World Championship after defeating VakıfBank İstanbul 3–0 in the final.

Teams
The number of participants on the basis of ranking list for European Cup Competitions:

League round
24 teams were drawn to 6 pools of 4 teams each.
The 1st and 2nd ranked qualified for the Playoff 12
The organizer of the Final Four were determined after the end of the League Round and qualified directly for the Final Four.
The team of the organizer of  the Final Four was replaced by the best 3rd ranked team with the best score.
The remaining 3rd placed and all 4th placed teams were eliminated.

Pool A

|}

|}

Pool B

|}

|}

Pool C

|}

|}

Pool D

|}

|}

Pool E

|}

|}

Pool F

|}

|}

Playoffs

Playoffs 12

|}

1Omichka Omsk won the golden set 15–10

First leg

|}

Second leg

|}

Playoffs 6 

|}

1VakıfBank İstanbul won the golden set 15–12

First leg 

|}

Second leg 

|}

Final Four 
The Final Four will be played on 15 and 16 March 2014. The participants will be the host team and the three winners of Playoff 6 round.

Organizer:  Rabita Baku
Venue:  Baku Crystal Hall, Baku, Azerbaijan

Bracket

Semifinals

|}

3rd place match

|}

Final

|}

Final standing

Awards

References

External links 

Women's Champions League

CEV Women's Champions League
CEV Women's Champions League
CEV Women's Champions League